Aldea Island is located between the Fallos Channel (continuation of Ladrillero Channel) and South of the Campana Island.

External links
 UN

Islands of Magallanes Region